Mer, also known as Mer-sur-Loire for clarity, is a commune in the Loir-et-Cher department, region of Centre-Val de Loire, France.

Population

See also
Communes of the Loir-et-Cher department

References

External links
 Official website

Communes of Loir-et-Cher